Frank Prather Sadler (June 30, 1872 – April 30, 1931) was an American politician and lawyer.

Biography
Sadler was born in Springfield, Illinois, and had lived on a farm, near Grove City, Illinois, in Christian County, Illinois. He went to the local public schools. Sadler studied at Valparaiso University and at Knox College in Galesburg, Illinois. Sadler received his bachelor's and law degrees from University of Michigan. Sadler practiced law in Chicago, and served as judge of the Chicago Municipal Court. Sadler served in the Illinois State Senate from 1919 to 1923, from Chicago, and was a Republican. Sadler died at Passavant Hospital in Chicago.

References

External links

1872 births
1931 deaths
People from Christian County, Illinois
Politicians from Springfield, Illinois
Politicians from Chicago
Lawyers from Chicago
Knox College (Illinois) alumni
Valparaiso University alumni
University of Michigan Law School alumni
Illinois state court judges
Republican Party Illinois state senators